Kaika may refer to:

Emperor Kaika of Japan
Kaika (yōkai), a phenomenon of mysterious flames of unknown cause.
Kaika, Tibet, village in Tibet
Kaika, Estonia, village in Antsla Parish, Võru County, Estonia
Kāinga, traditional Māori villages, spelt kaika in southern dialects of Māori